Labyrint is a Swedish drama television series on TV4. It has been called the biggest capital investment for the channel ever. The show premiered on October 11, 2007.

Characters
Main roles

Family

Blue

TV4 (Sweden) original programming
Swedish drama television series